"Let It Bleed" is a 2006 episode of STV's
Rebus television series. It was the fourth episode broadcast in the show's third season, and starred Ken Stott in the title role. 
The episode was based on the Ian Rankin novel of the same name.

Plot
When Rebus investigates the suicide of a petty crook at an investment bank, he discovers the man has a photograph of a child in Africa, with the words "Alto Chicampo". He finds a connection from the man to a chemical company, which is building a plant in the city supported by local politicians eager for the employment opportunities for the city. He also finds a link to an ex-employee, who is planning to blow the whistle on the company. When she is also found dead, the situation becomes murkier, with the whiff of corruption in high places.

Cast
Ken Stott as DI John Rebus
Claire Price as DS Siobhan Clarke
Pip Torrens as Andrew Hamill 
Anna Chancellor as Amanda Morrison

Footnotes

External links

2006 British television episodes
Rebus (TV series) episodes